In Mormonism, a penalty was an oath made by participants of the original Nauvoo endowment ceremony instituted by Joseph Smith in 1843 and further developed by Brigham Young after Smith's death. Mormon critics refer to the penalty as a "blood oath," because it required the participant to swear never to reveal certain key symbols of the endowment ceremony, including the penalty itself, while symbolically enacting ways in which a person may be executed. The penalties were similar to oaths made as part of a particular rite of Freemasonry practiced in western New York at the time the endowment was developed.

During the 20th century, The Church of Jesus Christ of Latter-day Saints (LDS Church) gradually softened the graphic nature of the penalties, and in 1990, removed them altogether from its version of the ceremony.

Original oaths
On May 4, 1842, Joseph Smith instituted the endowment ritual in Nauvoo, Illinois. At three different stages of the endowment, participants were asked to take an oath of secrecy regarding the ceremony . The participants promised that – rather than reveal the content of the ceremony – they would suffer the following:

Stage 1 : "my throat ... be cut from ear to ear, and my tongue torn out by its roots;"
Stage 2 : "our breasts ... be torn open, our hearts and vitals torn out and given to the birds of the air and the beasts of the field;"
Stage 3 : "our body ... be cut asunder and all your bowels gush out."

each of the penalties accompanied by gestures known as the "execution of the penalty" which simulated the actions described in the oath . 
Stage 1: The participant placed his or her right hand palm-down with the thumb extended and the tip of the thumb just under the left ear. The gesture was made by drawing the tip of the thumb swiftly across the throat until the thumb was just under the right ear then dropping the hand and arm quickly to the side of the participant's body.
Stage 2: The participant placed his or her hand in a cup form over the left breast. The gesture was made by pulling the hand swiftly across the breast then quickly dropping the hand and arm to the side of the participant's body.
Stage 3: The participant placed his or her right hand palm-down with the thumb extended and the tip of the thumb on the left of the torso just above the left hip. The gesture was made by drawing the thumb swiftly across the stomach until the thumb was just above the right hip and the hand and arm were quickly dropped to the side of the participant's body.

The oaths and their accompanying gestures resembled certain oaths performed in a particular Freemasonry tradition in western New York at the time, in which participants promised:
Oath of an "Entered Apprentice Mason": "I will … never reveal any part or parts, art or arts, point or points of the secret arts and mysteries of ancient Freemasonry. . . binding myself under no less penalty than to have my throat cut across, my tongue torn out by the roots" .  "This is given by drawing your right hand across your throat, the thumb next to your throat." .
Oath of a "Fellow Craft Mason": "I … most solemnly and sincerely promise and swear, that I will not give the degree of a Fellow Craft Mason to anyone of an inferior degree nor to any other being in the known world … binding myself under no less penalty than to have my left breast torn open and my heart and vitals taken from thence … to become a prey to the wild beasts of the field and vulture of the air" . "The sign is given by drawing your right hand-flat with the palm of it next to your breast across your breast from the left to the right side with some quickness and dropping it down by your side." .  
Oath of a "Master Mason": "I … most solemnly and sincerely promise and swear in addition to my former obligations that I will not give the degree of a Master Mason to any of an inferior degree nor to any other being in the known world … binding myself under no less penalty than to have my body severed in two in the midst and divided to the north and south, my bowels burnt to ashes" .  "The Penal Sign is given by putting the right hand to the left side of the bowels, the hand open with the thumb next to the belly and drawing it across the belly and letting it fall; this is done tolerably quick. This alludes to the penalty of the obligation: 'Having my body severed in twain,' etc." .

Changes
Beginning in 1919, LDS Church president Heber J. Grant appointed a committee charged with revising the endowment ceremony which was done under the direction of apostle George F. Richards from 1921 to 1927. Among the changes instituted was a modification of the oaths. While the gestures remained unchanged, the church clarified the verbal description of the oath with the phrase, "rather than do so, I would suffer my life to be taken."

Elimination
In April 1990, the LDS Church eliminated the oaths and the gestures from the endowment. During the period when these oaths were used, there was no documented instance in which a person was killed by the LDS Church or committed suicide for having violated the oaths of secrecy of the endowment.

Confusion with other doctrines
These penalty oaths and the oath of vengeance are often confused. The oath of vengeance—a promise to pray for justice for the murders of Joseph Smith and his brother Hyrum—was removed from the endowment in 1927 as part of the church's "Good Neighbor" policy, and the penalty oaths were removed in 1990. The penalty oaths are also frequently confused with the concept of blood atonement.

Continuation by Mormon fundamentalists
Some groups within the Mormon fundamentalist movement continue to practice the endowment without modification. These groups still participate in these oaths when performing the endowment. Some of the denominations that continue to perform the original endowment include the Fundamentalist Church of Jesus Christ of Latter-Day Saints, the Apostolic United Brethren, and the True and Living Church of Jesus Christ of Saints of the Last Days.

See also
 Mormonism and violence
 Criticism of Mormonism

References

.
.
.
.

External links
Old Testament oaths and temple rites, by W. John Walsh

History of the Church of Jesus Christ of Latter-day Saints
Latter Day Saint temple practices
Mormon fundamentalism
Mormonism and violence
Religious oaths
Punishments in religion
Latter Day Saint terms
Mormonism and Freemasonry
Mormonism and death